An oculus is a circular opening in the center of a dome or in a wall. Originating in antiquity, it is a feature of Byzantine and Neoclassical architecture. It is  also known as an œil-de-boeuf from the French, or simply a "bull's-eye".

History

Classical
The oculus was used by the Ancient Romans, one of the finest examples being that in the dome of the Pantheon. Open to the weather, it allows rain and air to enter and fall to the floor, where it is carried away through drains.

Byzantine
The oculus was widely used in the architecture of the Byzantine Empire. It was applied to buildings in Syria in the 5th and 6th centuries and again in the 10th century. In Constantinople's Myrelaion Church (c. 920), there are two oculi above the stringcourse on both lateral facades.

Renaissance
Early examples of the oculus in Renaissance architecture can be seen in Florence Cathedral, in the nave clerestory and topping the crowns of the arcade arches.

Neoclassical
Since the revival of dome construction beginning in the Italian Renaissance, open oculi have been replaced by light-transmitting cupolas and other round windows, openings, and skylights. They can be seen in the pediments of Palladio's Villa Rotonda, though not in the dome. Use of oculus windows became more popular in Baroque architecture. Widely used by Neo-Palladian architects including Colen Campbell, one can be seen in the dome of Thomas Jefferson's Rotunda at the University of Virginia.

Examples

References

External links

Ceilings
Domes
Roofs
Windows
Architectural elements